Elbasan County is one of the 12 counties of Albania. The population is 266,245 (2021), in an area of 3199 km². Its capital is the city Elbasan.

Administrative divisions
Until 2000, Elbasan County was subdivided into four districts: Elbasan, Gramsh, Librazhd, and Peqin. Since the 2015 local government reform, the county consists of the following 7 municipalities: Belsh, Cërrik, Elbasan, Gramsh, Librazhd, Peqin and Prrenjas. Before 2015, it consisted of the following 50 municipalities:

 Belsh
 Bradashesh
 Cërrik
 Elbasan
 Fierzë
 Funarë
 Gjergjan
 Gjinar
 Gjoçaj
 Gostimë
 Gracen
 Gramsh
 Grekan
 Hotolisht
 Kajan
 Karinë
 Klos
 Kodovjat
 Kukur
 Kushovë
 Labinot-Fushë
 Labinot-Mal
 Lenie
 Librazhd
 Lunik
 Mollas
 Orenjë
 Pajovë
 Papër
 Peqin
 Përparim
 Pishaj
 Polis
 Poroçan
 Prrenjas
 Qendër Librazhd
 Qukës
 Rrajcë
 Rrasë
 Shalës
 Shezë
 Shirgjan
 Shushicë
 Skënderbegas
 Steblevë
 Stravaj
 Sult
 Tregan
 Tunjë
 Zavalinë

The municipalities consist of about 385 towns and villages in total. See Villages of Elbasan County for a structured list.

Demographics 
Elbasan County has 266,245 inhabitants as of January 2021. Ethnic groups in the county include, as of the last national census from 2011:
Albanians = 253,170 (85.58%)
Macedonians = 94 (0.03%)
Montenegrins = 10 (0.00%)
Aromanians = 747 (0.25%)
Romani = 1,064 (0.36%)
Egyptians = 433 (0.15%)
Turkish = 300 (0.13%)
others = 149 (0.05%)
no answer = 39,980 (13.51%)

References

External links
Regional Council of Elbasan

 
Elbasan